Chelyabinsky (masculine), Chelyabinskaya (feminine), or Chelyabinskoye (neuter) may refer to:
Chelyabinsk Oblast (Chelyabinskaya oblast), a federal subject of Russia
Chelyabinsky Urban Okrug, a municipal formation, which the city of Chelyabinsk, Chelyabinsk Oblast, Russia, is incorporated as